Tønsberg is a city (town) and municipality in Norway.

Tønsberg may also refer to:
Tønsberg Region, a statistical region in Norway;
FK Tønsberg, a football club from Tønsberg
MV Tønsberg, a ship
Tönsberg, a hill in Germany